Jorinde Voigt is a German artist, best-known for large-scale drawings that develop complex notation systems derived from music, philosophy, and phenomenology. She is a professor of painting and drawing at the University of Fine Arts Hamburg. Voigt lives and works in Berlin.

Work

Voigt’s large-scale drawings often emerge from a system of guidelines and rules and therefore her work has drawn comparisons to Minimalist and Conceptual artists, namely the event scores and visual artworks of the 2020s avant-garde such as John Cage and Iannis Xenakis; the algorithmic patterns of Hanne Darboven; and the procedural parameters of Sol Lewitt. Yet despite these comparisons, Voigt’s work differs markedly from this lineage, particularly because her rigorous systems emerge from how the inner world—such as personal experience, emotion, and memory intersect with external conditions. Voigt has described such a process as providing “instructions for the imagination.”

In 2002, Voigt turned away from the medium of photography and began to make the drawings that she is best known for, which she has alternately described over the years as “projection surfaces, visualized thought models, scientific experimental designs, notations, scores and diagrams. The artist developed her specific symbolic system in the series Notations Florida and Indonesia, both from 2003. According to art historian Astrid Schmidt-Burkhardt, the sixty ink drawings that comprise Notations Florida, “already contain all the registers of perception that would also distinguish her later works.” The resulting drawings convey a series of the artist’s impressions when traveling from Orlando to Miami. As Voigt explains, “I still took stock of situations, but the difference was that I no longer pressed the shutter but rather took notes. In this way, pictures emerged that could no longer be classified as perspectival; rather, they reflected the juxtaposition and the simultaneity of what I experienced.” Further cycles of work emerged from the perception study developed in this early series. Although formally and conceptually diverse, each of these work cycles shares an interest in making visible that which is “behind” things and capturing the simultaneity of experience through markings on paper.

Views on Chinese erotic art: from 16th to 20th century (2011/2012) 
The works from this series combine notation and collage techniques to translate images of historic Chinese erotic paintings and prints into diagrams comprising picture and text elements. Central to this series is a “visual reading” process, which analyzes images as if they were texts. Referencing the Chinese and Japanese painting tradition of capturing a scene in multiple views, Voigt subsumed up to 100 views—each one capturing a specific gaze—onto each sheet of paper, so that the collages resemble scientific tables. To make the works, Voigt cut silhouettes from colored paper that corresponded in color and profile to a particular element of the composition, such as the shape of a woman’s hairdo, a bathtub, or a lover’s embrace. The number of silhouettes were determined by how many times she looked at the detail. Poet and critic John Yau writes, “by unraveling the erotic views into their constituent parts, the artist essentially undresses the encounter, turning it into a collection of visual and written data.” With color choices and notations dictated by the very act of looking itself, the drawings appear as a mental construct with which to investigate human perception, raising questions about language, cognition, intuition, and association.

Piece for Words and Views (2012) Love as passion: On the Codification of Intimacy (2013/2014) 
This 36-part series marks a radical shift in the artist practice. While earlier works developed notation systems that visually translated the perception of objects or situations, Piece for Words and Views is the first work cycle in which Voigt concretely attempts to find images that correspond to internal processes. With this shift in Voigt’s work, finding forms that correlate to imagination, memory, experience and emotion moved to the forefront of her practice. Piece for Words and Views explores how, when reading, words have the capacity to produce images in the reader’s imagination. The series transforms specific words from A Lover's Discourse by Roland Barthes into both abstract and representational imagery. Each mental image receives a specific color and form, which is rendered via contoured drawing on colored vellum. The final drawing is made by collaging the multiple images, forming an ambiguous relation among them. A similar process is at work in Voigt’s 48-part series Love as Passion: On the Codification of Intimacy, which takes responds to Niklas Luhmann's 1982 book by the same name. Each drawing in Codification of Intimacy takes a chapter, passage, or key word that Voigt distilled from Luhmann’s book as its source. Voigt begins each drawing by marking the passages in the text that triggered intuitive associations.

Immersion (2018/2019) 
Immersion takes as its starting point the process of perception itself. It deals less with exactly what we perceive than how we perceive. The series seeks to develop appropriate forms to understand the inner constitution of archetypal images, that which is behind what we see, and how such images might be experienced or shared collectively. A central element in these works is the torus, a shape that Voigt conceives of as a model for perception, in combination with arrows, axes, and lines. Voigt first began working with these forms in her Lacan Studies from 2016. She begins each work in the Immersion series by immersing paper in pigment. Each color is selected to denote a particular atmosphere or emotional state. A large torus figure forms the central element of the composition and in each variation its dimensions morph and rotate. Voigt describes Immersion as a “time-based series,” with each piece created one after the other and representing a different moment in time. “When you look at the series as a whole you can see the exact connection between those moments,” Voigt explains, “In real life you focus on each moment at a time, and you can’t stop and zoom out in order to see the bigger picture.” Another variable element of the compositions are Voigt’s use of gold and precious metals. She incorporates metal inlays by cutting out sections of the drawings and gilding them with gold, aluminum, and copper leaf and reintegrating the shapes into their original place in the composition.

Museum collections 
Jorinde Voigt’s work is included the international museums and public collections, including Centre Pompidou, Paris; Museum of Modern Art, New York; Art Institute of Chicago; Kupferstichkabinett Berlin; Instanbul Modern; the Federal Art Collection Bonn, the Hamburger Kunsthalle, Hamburg; Kunsthaus Zürich; Kunstmuseum Stuttgart; Museum of Contemporary Art, Oslo; and the Grafische Sammlung, Munich.

Exhibitions 

 2019 Wall Drawings Series: Jorinde Voigt, Menil Drawing Institute, Houston
 2019 Jorinde Voigt – Universal Turn, Horst-Janssen-Museum, Oldenburg
2018 Jorinde Voigt – Divine Territory, St. Matthäus Church, Berlin
 2017 Jorinde Voigt – A New Kind of Joy, Kunsthalle Nürnberg
 2014 Jorinde Voigt – Super Passion, MACRO Museum of Contemporary Art of Rome, Rome
 2013 Jorinde Voigt – Systematic Notations, Nevada Museum of Art NMA
 2011 Jorinde Voigt, Von der Heydt Museum, Wuppertal
 2010 Jorinde Voigt – Staat / Random I-XI, Gemeentemuseum Den Haag
 2009 Jorinde Voigt – Symphonic Area, HDKV Heidelberger Kunstverein
 2008 Jorinde Voigt - Dualnab Nassauischer Kunstverein Wiesbaden

References

Further reading 

Jorinde Voigt: Immersion, texts Paul Feigelfeld and Jesi Khadivi (Berlin: Hatje Cantz, 2019)
Ellen Seifermann (ed), Jorinde Voigt: Shift (Berlin: Walther König, 2018)
David Nolan (ed): Jorinde Voigt: Ludwig Van Beethoven Sonatas 1-3, texts by Franz W. Kaiser and Jorinde Voigt (Berlin: Hatje Cantz, 2015)
Julia Klüser & Hans-Peter Wipplinger (eds), Jorinde Voigt: Now (Berlin: Walther König, 2015)
David Nolan (ed): Jorinde Voigt – Codification of Intimacy, Works on Niklas Luhmann, Liebe als Passion, Text: Lisa Sintermann, Jorinde Voigt, Revolver Publishing, 2014
Jorinde Voigt (eds): Jorinde Voigt – Views on Views on Decameron. Text : Peter Lang, Cura Books, 2013
Kai 10 / Raum fur Kunst, Arthena Foundation (ed): Drawing a Universe. Text: Ludwig Seyfarth, Lisa Sintermann, Kerber Verlag, 2013 
David Nolan (ed): Jorinde Voigt – Piece for Words and Views. Text: John Yau, Jorinde Voigt, Hatje Cantz, 2012
Museum van Bommel van Dam (ed): Nachtliches Konzert – Gregor Hildebrandt und Jorinde Voigt. Text: Niklas Maak, 2012 
Neues Museum Nurnberg (eds): Internationaler Faber-Castell Preis fur Zeichnung 2012 [International Faber-Castell Prize for Drawing 2012]. Text: Lisa Sintermann 2012
Julia Kluser: Jorinde Voigt – Nexus. Text: Andreas Schalhorn, Lisa Sintermann, Von der Heydt Museum Wuppertal, Hatje Cantz, 2011 
Regina Gallery: Jorinde Voigt – 1000 Views. Text: Lisa Sintermann, Jorinde Voigt, 2011
Lisa Sintermann, Die Vermessung des Unsichtbaren – Notationsverfahren in den konzeptuellen Zeichnungen von Jorinde Voigt [Measuring the Invisible -notation method in Jorinde Voigt's conceptual drawings], University of Hildesheim, 2010 
Jochen Kienbaum (ed): Jorinde Voigt – Botanic Code, Kienbaum Artists' Books 2011, Snoeck Verlagsgesellschaft, 2010
Jorinde Voigt, Clemens Fahnemann (ed): Jorinde Voigt – ReWrite. Text: Andrew Cannon, KraskaEckstein Verlag, 2008
Elke Guhn, Nassauischer Kunstverein Wiesbaden (ed): Jorinde Voigt – DUAL. Text: Clemens crumbs, Kerber Verlag, 2008 
Holger Peter Saupe (ed): Jorinde Voigt – Otto Dix Prize 2008 laureate, Gera Art Collection 2008

German artists
Living people
Year of birth missing (living people)